Wings Over Miami is a flying aviation museum of historically significant aircraft, located at Miami Executive Airport in Miami-Dade County, Florida, United States,  southwest of the central business district of Miami.

History
The museum was conceived as a replacement for the Weeks Air Museum which had been located at the airport, but which was moved to Polk County, Florida after having its facility and almost all of its aircraft damaged by Hurricane Andrew in 1992.

The departure of the Weeks collection left an aviation historical deficit in the Miami area. In 2001 four military and classic plane enthusiasts decided to create a new museum to use the facility. The new museum's board was made up of its founders: Walter Orth, Larry Ploucha, Vincent Tirado and Tom Righetti. They agreed from the start that Wings Over Miami would be a flying museum, meaning that aircraft from the collection would be airworthy and would be flown regularly.

The aircraft collection that was assembled included representation from a broad range of aviation history, including vintage aircraft, World War II and the Cold War.

Aircraft 

The museum collection includes:

 Aero L29-R Delfín
 Aero L-39C Albatros
 Brown B-1 Racer
 Consolidated PBY-5A Catalina
 Douglas A-26C Invader
 Douglas C-117D
 Grumman F-14D Tomcat
 Ikarus Aero 3-A
 Ryan PT-22
 Nanchang CJ-6A
 North American AT-6D Texan
 North American T-28 Trojan
 North American SNJ-6
 Schweizer SGS 1-26
 Yakovlev Yak-52

References

External links

Official website

Aerospace museums in Florida
Museums in Miami-Dade County, Florida
Military and war museums in Florida
Museums established in 2001
2001 establishments in Florida